"Heat" is a song by American singer Chris Brown featuring American rapper Gunna. It was released on June 20, 2019 as the fifth single from Brown's ninth studio album, Indigo (2019).

Background and composition 
It was unexpectedly teased one day before its release on June 20, 2019 on Chris Brown's Instagram. He announced its release a week prior. The song is a mid-tempo R&B song, produced by American record producer Buddah Bless, with instrumentation and melodic lines that blend the classic R&B style with strong trap influences.

Chart performance 
"Heat" debuted at number 77 on the US Billboard Hot 100 chart, on the week of September 14, 2019. After climbing the chart for ten weeks, the song eventually peaked at number 36 on the chart. "Heat" also topped the US Rhythmic Airplay chart. This became Brown's 11th number one on the chart, and his second during 2019, having previously logged four non-consecutive weeks in the top spot in 2019 with "No Guidance". "Heat" moved Brown up to fourth-equal on the list of artists with most number-one songs on the chart. This also became Gunna's first number one on the chart.

Music video 
The music video was released on August 30, 2019. It was directed by Brown and Edgar Esteves.

Personnel 
Credits adapted from the album's liner notes.
 Chris Brown – lead vocals
 Gunna – featured vocals
 Buddah Bless – production
 Patrizio Pigliapoco – recording, mixing engineer, mastering engineer, vocal engineer

Charts

Weekly charts

Year-end charts

References 

2019 singles
2019 songs
Chris Brown songs
Gunna (rapper) songs
Songs written by Chris Brown
Songs written by Gunna (rapper)
Songs written by Buddah Bless
Song recordings produced by Buddah Bless

RCA Records singles